Calagrassor poppei is a species of sea snail, a marine gastropod mollusk in the family Eosiphonidae, the true whelks and their allies.

Description
A carnivorous and predatory  sea snail found in the Philippines, this mollusk has a shell size that averages 16.6mm (0.65 inches) 
Classification: Biota (Superdomain) > Animalia (Kingdom) > Mollusca (Phylum) > Gastropoda (Class) > Caenogastropoda (Subclass) > Neogastropoda (Order) > Buccinoidea (Superfamily) > Buccinidae (Family) > Calagrassor (Genus) > Calagrassor poppei (Species) > 

Common Family: Neptunes, Whelks and Allies
Common Name: Poppe's Delicate Whelk named for Guido T. Poppe, conchologist and museum-quality collector, photographer, and author active in the field since childhood.

Mollusk Shell Facts 

The species is known to attain a size of 50+ mm. An operculum is present.

Distribution
This marine species occurs off the Philippines.

References

 Fraussen K. 2001. A new Eosipho (Buccinidae) from the Philippine Islands. Gloria Maris 39(5–6) : 90–97

External links
 
  Kantor Yu.I., Puillandre N., Fraussen K., Fedosov A.E. & Bouchet P. (2013) Deep-water Buccinidae (Gastropoda: Neogastropoda) from sunken wood, vents and seeps: Molecular phylogeny and taxonomy. Journal of the Marine Biological Association of the United Kingdom, 93(8): 2177–2195.

Eosiphonidae
Gastropods described in 2001